Sandeep Sharma (born 18 May 1993) is an Indian cricketer who plays domestic cricket for Chandigarh. He is a right-arm medium pace bowler. Sharma has represented India at two Under-19 World Cups - 2010 and 2012. He was a part Under-19 team that won Under-19 World Cup in 2012. He was signed up by Kings XI Punjab in 2013.

Indian Premier League
Sharma took three wickets for 21 runs in his IPL debut match when he played for Kings XI Punjab against Sunrisers Hyderabad on 11 May 2013. In the 2017 edition of the IPL, Sharma claimed 3/22 from his four overs against Royal Challengers Bangalore and in the process became the first bowler to get the trio of Chris Gayle, Virat Kohli and AB de Villiers out in the same game.

In January 2018, he was bought by the Sunrisers Hyderabad in the 2018 IPL auction. In February 2022, he was bought by the Punjab Kings in the auction for the 2022 Indian Premier League tournament.

International career
After his impressive domestic season with Punjab and Kings XI Punjab Sharma was picked in the 15-man squad for the limited overs tour of Zimbabwe in July 2015. He made his Twenty20 International debut against Zimbabwe on 17 July 2015.

References

External links
 Sandeep Sharma - Cricinfo profile
 Sandeep Sharma's profile page on Wisden

1993 births
Living people
Indian cricketers
India Twenty20 International cricketers
Punjab, India cricketers
Cricketers from Patiala
Sunrisers Hyderabad cricketers
Punjab Kings cricketers
India Green cricketers